The Love Winner, also known as I Love How You Love Me, is a romantic movie starred by Jimmy Lin (林志颖), Liu Yi Fei (刘亦菲), Xu Shaoyang (许绍洋)，and Yang Gongru (杨恭如). It tells a story that Wang Han Wen (王汉文) who has been studied in a martial arts school has no intention to take over his farther's company comes to Hong Kong to teach in the Businessmen and Technical College. In that college, he meets a girl Qian Yue Shan (钱月珊), whose father has been in heavy debt and she has to pay the money back for her father. Wang Han Wen'father knows that Qian Yue Shan (钱月珊) has close relationship with his son, so he ask her to persuade his son to go back home. He tells her if she succeeds in getting his son back home, he will help her to pay the debt. She has to take it seriously after starting it as a joke and conducts a series of love campaigns.

Cast 
Jimmy Lin (林志颖) as Du Heng Feng (杜恒风)
Liu Yifei (刘亦菲) as Jin Qiao Li (金巧莉)
Xu Shao Yang (许绍洋) as Wang Han Wen (王汉文)
Yang Gong Ru (杨恭如) as Qian Yue Shan (钱月珊0
Dou Zhi Kong (窦智孔) as Li Zhen (李震)
Wang Dao (王道) as (杜南)

Synopsis 
Smuggling businessman Du Nan (杜南) buys the First College in order to force his son to go to school without being dropping out. But his son Du Heng Feng (杜恒风) has no desire to study and often skips class. He has nothing to do but ask his fellow to drag his son to school and supervises him all the day. Meanwhile, the police in HongKong sent two undercover officers to get touch in Du Heng Feng so as to grasp the evidence of his father's crimes.
Du Heng Feng falls in love with Jin Qiao Li (金巧莉), a girl who has just lost her boyfriend and has no will to date anyone else.
Jin Qiao Li's friend falls in love with her teacher, but the teacher has crush on Qian Yue Shan (钱月珊). One of the officers helps her to put the moves on the teacher but she fails. She falls in love with him in the end.
Having gone through such a memorable experience, they become best friends. Eventually, the three pairs of lovers culminate their long friendship.

References 
 http://video.baidu.com/v?ct=301989888&rn=20&pn=0&db=0&s=8&word=%C1%B5%B0%AE%B4%F3%D3%AE%BC%D2&fr=ala3&ty=21
 http://news.baidu.com/ns?cl=2&rn=20&tn=news&word=恋爱大赢家

External links 
 

2004 films
2000s Mandarin-language films
2000s romance films
Films directed by Kevin Chu
Taiwanese romance films